GCSS may refer to:
Game Critter Super-Squad!, a comic strip
 GEWEX Cloud System Study, a meteorological study by the Global Energy and Water Exchanges
Global Combat Support System and GCSS-Army, a framework for managing military logistics
Government Comprehensive Secondary School, Port Harcourt, Rivers State, Nigeria
Grand Cross of the Order of St. Sylvester, a class in one of the orders of knighthood of the Holy See
Gwinnett College - Sandy Springs, Lilburn, Georgia, United States

See also
GCCS (disambiguation)
GCS (disambiguation)
GSCC (disambiguation)